Megalopalpus is a genus of butterflies in the family Lycaenidae.

Species
Megalopalpus angulosus Grünberg, 1910
Megalopalpus metaleucus Karsch, 1893
Megalopalpus simplex Röber, 1886
Megalopalpus zymna (Westwood, [1851])

References

Seitz A. Die Gross-Schmetterlinge der Erde 13: Die Afrikanischen Tagfalter. Plate XIII 65

Miletinae
Lycaenidae genera
Taxa named by Julius Röber